Kilmarnock is a town in Lancaster and Northumberland counties in the U.S. Commonwealth of Virginia. The population was 1,487 at the 2010 census. It is located near the mouth of the Rappahannock River and is located within the Northern Neck George Washington Birthplace American Viticultural Area winemaking appellation.  There is a small hospital in the town. Lancaster Middle School, grades 4–8, is also located in town.  Approximately 500 students attend the school.

The town was named after Kilmarnock, in Scotland.

Geography
Kilmarnock is located at  (37.712437, -76.381707).

According to the United States Census Bureau, the town has a total area of 2.9 square miles (7.4 km²), of which, 2.9 square miles (7.4 km²)is land and 0.35% is water.

Kilmarnock hosts the Holly Ball, a debutante ball founded in 1895, at the Indian Creek Yacht and Country Club every December.

Demographics

At the 2000 census there were 1,244 people, 547 households, and 305 families living in the town. The population density was 435.6 people per square mile (167.9/km²). There were 607 housing units at an average density of 212.6 per square mile (81.9/km²).  The racial makeup of the town was 79.74% White, 19.05% African American, 0.08% Native American, 0.32% Asian, 0.08% from other races, and 0.72% from two or more races. Hispanic or Latino people of any race were 0.56%.

Of the 547 households 23.6% had children under the age of 18 living with them, 39.9% were married couples living together, 13.0% had a female householder with no husband present, and 44.2% were non-families. 40.8% of households were one person and 25.4% were one person aged 65 or older. The average household size was 1.99 and the average family size was 2.66.

The age distribution was 18.4% under the age of 18, 4.7% from 18 to 24, 19.3% from 25 to 44, 20.3% from 45 to 64, and 37.4% 65 or older. The median age was 52 years. For every 100 females there were 68.8 males. For every 100 females age 18 and over, there were 64.0 males.

The median household income was $31,625 and the median family income  was $43,500. Males had a median income of $30,167 versus $20,875 for females. The per capita income for the town was $21,172. About 9.1% of families and 14.5% of the population were below the poverty line, including 18.2% of those under age 18 and 10.2% of those age 65 or over.

References

External links
 Rappahannock Record - local newspaper

Towns in Lancaster County, Virginia
Towns in Northumberland County, Virginia
Northern Neck